David E. Campbell is an American sound engineer. He won an Academy Award for Best Sound and has been nominated for five more in the same category. He has worked on over 160 films since 1977.

Selected filmography
Campbell won an Academy Award for Best Sound and has been nominated for another five:

Won
 The Matrix (1999)

Nominated
 Dick Tracy (1990)
 Legends of the Fall (1994)
 The Perfect Storm (2000)
 Pirates of the Caribbean: The Curse of the Black Pearl (2003)
 Flags of Our Fathers (2006)

References

External links

Year of birth missing (living people)
Living people
American audio engineers
Best Sound Mixing Academy Award winners
Best Sound BAFTA Award winners